Sarlagab or Zarlagab (fl. late 3rd millennium BC) was the second Gutian ruler of the Gutian Dynasty of Sumer mentioned on the Sumerian King List as possibly reigning for six years. 

Sarlagab may have been a contemporary of the Akkadian king Shar-kali-sharri, if he is the same Gutian king Sharlag whom Shar-kali-sharri captured according to one of his year-names: "the year in which Szarkaliszarri (...) took prisoner Szarlag(ab) the king of Gutium". According to the King List, he was the successor of Inkishush. Shulme then succeeded Sarlagab.

See also

 History of Sumer
 List of Mesopotamian dynasties

References

Sumerian kings
22nd-century BC rulers
Gutian dynasty of Sumer